This is a list of mountains in the state of Texas greater than 2,000 feet.

References

 
Texas
Mountain peaks